Adam Alexander Milstead (born July 3, 1987) is an American former mixed martial arts fighter who competed in the Light Heavyweight division of the Ultimate Fighting Championship. A professional competitor from 2009 up until 2018, he also competed for King of the Cage.

Background
Born and raised in Calvert, Maryland, Milstead began wrestling in the second grade, and was a standout in football and wrestling at Calvert High School, graduating in 2006. Milstead later continued his football career at the collegiate level for half a semester before dropping out. 

Adam got married in June 2020 to Pittsburgh native, Mary Rodavich. They have a yellow Labrador retriever, Cal, who is named after Adam’s hometown of Calvert County, MD.

Mixed martial arts career

Early career
Milstead held an amateur record of 10–2 before making his professional MMA debut in May 2011. After losing his first match, he amassed a record of 7-1 before signing with the UFC.

Ultimate Fighting Championship 
Milstead made his UFC debut in May 2016 as he faced Chris de la Rocha at UFC Fight Night: Almeida vs. Garbrandt. He won the fight by TKO in the second round.

For his second fight with the promotion, Milstead faced Curtis Blaydes at UFC Fight Night: Bermudez vs. Korean Zombie on February 4, 2017. He originally lost the fight via TKO in the second round; however, the win was later overturned to a No Contest when Blaydes tested positive for marijuana.

For his next fight, Milstead moved down to the Light Heavyweight division. He faced Jordan Johnson on March 3, 2018 at UFC 222. He lost the fight by split decision.

Milstead faced Mike Rodríguez on December 15, 2018 at UFC on Fox 31. He lost the fight via TKO in the first round.  Following the fight, Milstead announced his retirement from MMA.

Mixed martial arts record

|-
|Loss
|align=center|8–3 (1)
|Mike Rodríguez
|TKO (knee to the body and punches)
|UFC on Fox: Lee vs. Iaquinta 2
|
|align=center|1
|align=center|2:59
|Milwaukee, Wisconsin, United States
|
|-
|Loss
| align=center| 8–2 (1)
|Jordan Johnson
|Decision (split)
|UFC 222 
|
|align=center|3
|align=center|5:00
|Las Vegas, Nevada, United States
|
|-
| NC
| align=center| 8–1 (1)
| Curtis Blaydes
| NC (overturned)
| UFC Fight Night: Bermudez vs. Korean Zombie
| February 4, 2017
| align=center| 2
| align=center| 0:59
| Houston, Texas, United States
|
|-
| Win
| align=center| 8–1
| Chris de la Rocha
| TKO (punches)
| UFC Fight Night: Almeida vs. Garbrandt
| May 29, 2016
| align=center| 2
| align=center| 4:01
| Las Vegas, Nevada, United States
|
|-
| Win
| align=center| 7–1
| Robert Morrow
| TKO (punches)
| KOTC: Hands of Steel
| September 26, 2015
| align=center| 1
| align=center| 1:55
| Washington, Pennsylvania, United States
|
|-
| Win
| align=center| 6–1
| Lewis Rumsey
| TKO (punches)
| GOTC MMA: Gladiators of the Cage 18
| August 22, 2015
| align=center| 1
| align=center| 1:10
| Cheswick, Pennsylvania, United States
|
|-
| Win
| align=center| 5–1
| Nick Smiley
| TKO (punches)
| Pinnacle FC: Pittsburgh Challenge Series 8
| July 12, 2014
| align=center| 1
| align=center| 0:58
| Canonsburg, Pennsylvania, United States
|
|-
| Win
| align=center| 4–1
| Tex Trismegistus
| Submission (armbar)
| Gladiators of the Cage: The North Shore's Rise to Power
| January 26, 2013
| align=center| 2
| align=center| 4:10
| Pittsburgh, Pennsylvania, United States
|
|-
| Win
| align=center| 3–1
| Bobby Gurley
| TKO (punches)
| Pinnacle FC: Pittsburgh Challenge Series 1
| December 29, 2012
| align=center| 1
| align=center| 3:49
| Pittsburgh, Pennsylvania, United States
|
|-
| Win
| align=center| 2–1
| DeAndre Billingsley
| Submission (guillotine choke)
| NAAFS: Midwest Combat Challenge 22
| September 21, 2012
| align=center| 1
| align=center| 1:20
| Medina, Ohio, United States
|
|-
| Win
| align=center| 1–1
| Nathan Bryant
| KO (punches)
| NAAFS: Caged Fury 17
| April 27, 2012
| align=center| 2
| align=center| 3:14
| Morgantown, West Virginia, United States
|
|-
| Loss
| align=center| 0–1
| Dane Bonnigson
| TKO (punches)
| NAAFS: Spohn vs. Hawk 2
| May 21, 2011
| align=center| 1
| align=center| 2:51
| Streetsboro, Ohio, United States
|
|-

References

External links
 
 

1987 births
Living people
American male mixed martial artists
Mixed martial artists utilizing wrestling
People from Cecil County, Maryland
Players of American football from Maryland
Sportspeople from the Delaware Valley
Ultimate Fighting Championship male fighters